The Valley of Geysers is a geyser field on Kamchatka Peninsula, Russia, and has the second largest concentration of geysers in the world. This  basin with approximately ninety geysers and many hot springs is situated on the Kamchatka Peninsula in the Russian Far East, predominantly on the left bank of the ever-deepening Geysernaya River, into which geothermal waters flow from a relatively young stratovolcano, Kikhpinych. It is part of the Kronotsky Nature Reserve, which, in turn, is incorporated into the World Heritage Site "Volcanoes of Kamchatka". The valley is difficult to reach, with helicopters providing the only feasible means of transport.

History

The "pulsating" geysers of Kamchatka were discovered by a local scientist, Tatyana Ustinova, in 1941. She published her findings fourteen years later, but there was little exploration of the area until 1972. A systematic survey was undertaken in the mid-1970s, and an automatic monitoring system was introduced in 1990. From the 1980s, the area was promoted across the Soviet Union as one of the tourist magnets of Kamchatka and the Russian Far East. Foreign tourists were allowed into the valley in 1991. About 3,000 tourists visited the site annually.

2007 Mudflow damage and aftermath

On June 3, 2007, a massive mudflow inundated two thirds of the valley. Oleg Mitvol of Russia's Service for the Oversight of Natural Resources said "we witnessed a unique natural event, but the consequences of such a natural catastrophe are irreversible." The World Heritage Site also expressed its deep concern over the issue. "This is tragic for humankind, in that we have lost one of the great natural wonders of the world", the World Wildlife Fund spokesman commented. On June 5, it was reported that a thermal lake was forming above the valley. The landslide occurred during filming of the documentary Wild Russia; it features footage of before and after the disaster.

The extent of permanent change is not yet clear, but may be less than was originally thought. As of June 9, 2007, waters have receded somewhat, exposing some of the submerged features. Velikan (Giant) Geyser, one of the field's largest, was not buried in the slide and has recently been observed to be active.

References

Further reading
 (Google translation)
Diana Gealdhill, 'Kamchatka', Odyssey Books, 2007.

External links
Landslide buries Valley of the Geysers at NASA Earth Observatory
Google Earth model of the Valley of Geysers – photos, movies, maps, schemes, landslide animation

Russian
Map of the Valley of Geysers and scheme of the landslide and the landslide-dammed lake With English translation. 
Description of the Valley of Geysers on the Official website of Kronotsky Nature Reserve

Russian and English

Valley of Geysers – what actually happened, Leonov and Leonov, Institute of Volcanology and Seismology, Far Eastern Branch of the Russian Academy of Sciences, 10 June 2007

Geysers of Russia
Bodies of water of Kamchatka Krai